Attilâ İlhan (15 June 1925 – 10 October 2005) was a Turkish poet, novelist, essayist, journalist and reviewer.

Early life and education
Attilâ İlhan was born in Menemen in İzmir Province, Turkey on 15 June 1925. He received most of his primary education in İzmir. However, because of his father's job, he completed his junior high school education in different cities. Aged 16 and enrolled in İzmir Atatürk High School, he got into trouble for sending a poem by Nazım Hikmet, a famous dissident communist Turkish poet, to a girl he was in love with. He was arrested and taken into custody for three weeks. He was also dismissed from school and jailed for two months. After his imprisonment, İlhan was forbidden from attending any schools in Turkey, thus interrupting his education.

Following a favourable court decision in 1941, he received permission to continue his education again and enrolled in Istanbul Işık High School. During the last year of his high school education, his uncle sent one of his poems to CHP Poetry Competition without telling Attilâ. The poem, Cebbaroğlu Mehemmed, won the second prize among many poems written by famous poets. He graduated from high school in 1942 and enrolled in Istanbul University's law school. However, he left midway through his legal education to pursue his own endeavours and published his first poetry book, Duvar (The Wall).

Years in Paris
In his second year at Istanbul University, he went to Paris in order to take part in supporting Nazım Hikmet. His observations of the French and their culture were to influence many of his works.

After returning to Turkey, he repeatedly ran into trouble with the police. Interrogations in Sansaryan Han influenced his works based on death, thriller, etc.

Istanbul–Paris–Izmir triangle
He returned to Paris again in 1951 because of an official investigation about an article in Gerçek newspaper. In this period he learned to speak French and studied Marxist philosophy. In the 1950s Attilâ İlhan spent his days along an Istanbul–Paris–İzmir triangle and during this period he became popular in Turkey. After returning to Turkey, he resumed studying law. However, in his last year at law school, he left university and took up a journalistic career. His relationship with the cinema also started in this year. He began writing movie reviews and critiques in Vatan newspaper.

Artistic versatility
After completing his military service in Erzurum in 1957, İlhan returned to Istanbul and concentrated on cinema. He wrote screenplays for nearly 15 movies under the pen name Ali Kaptanoğlu. However, cinema didn't meet his expectations and he returned to Paris in 1960. During this period, he analyzed the development of socialism and television. The unexpected death of his father caused him to return to his hometown of İzmir, where he would remain for the next eight years. During this period, he served as the editorial writer and editor-in-chief of the Democratic İzmir newspaper. During the same years, he also wrote poetry books, Yasak Sevişmek and Bıçağın Ucu of the Aynanın İçindekiler series.

Political views
Attilâ İlhan was a kemalist and socialist. In his later life, he appeared on television programs where he discussed literary and social issues. Although he was a devoted communist, he never espoused Stalinism and he always took a nationalistic point of view within communism. He was also an intellectual figure in Turkey where his ideas influenced the public. In his series of books entitled Hangi …, he questioned the imitative intellectualism which dominated the cultural and political life of Turkey.

Personal life
He married in 1968 and remained so for 15 years. He was the brother of famous Turkish actress Çolpan İlhan, wife of the late Sadri Alışık, himself a famous actor.

Death
Attilâ İlhan died of a heart-attack in Istanbul on 10 October 2005. Attilâ İlhan was buried at Aşiyan Asri Cemetery.

List of works

Poems
 Duvar (The Wall)
 Sisler Bulvarı (Boulevard of Mists)
 Yağmur Kaçağı (Escapee from Rain)
 Ben Sana Mecburum (Compelled to You)
 Bela Çiçeği (Trouble Flower)
 Yasak Sevişmek ( Forbidden Love)
 Tutuklunun Günlüğü (A Prisoner's Diary)
 Böyle Bir Sevmek (Loving Like This)
 Elde Var Hüzün (Grief Remains)
 Korkunun Krallığı (Kingdom of Fear)
 Ayrılık Sevdaya Dahil (Parting is in Love)
 Allende Allende
 Pia

Novels
 Sokaktaki Adam (The Man on the Street)
 Zenciler Birbirine Benzemez (Black Men Don't Look Alike)
 Kurtlar Sofrası (Feast of Wolves)
 Bıçağın Ucu (Tip of the Knife)
 Sırtlan Payı (Hyena's Share)
 Yaraya Tuz Basmak (Salting the Wound)
 Dersaadet'te Sabah Ezanları (Morning Adhans in the Abode of Felicity (Istanbul))
 O Karanlıkta Biz (Us in That Darkness)
 Fena Halde Leman (Desperately Leman)
 Haco Hanım Vay (Haco Hanım Wow)
 Allah'ın Süngüleri "Reis Paşa" (Bayonets of God "Reis Pasha")

Essays
 Abbas Yolcu
 Yanlış Kadınlar Yanlış Erkekler (Wrong Women Wrong Men)
 Hangi Sol (Which Left)
 Hangi Sağ (Which Right)
 Hangi Batı (Which West)
 Hangi Seks (Which Sex)
 Hangi Atatürk (Which Atatürk)
 Hangi Edebiyat (Which Literature)
 Hangi Laiklik (Which Laisism)
 Hangi Küreselleşme (Which Globalization)
 Gerçekçilik Savaşı (War of Reality)
 İkinci Yeni Savaşı (War of the Second New)
 Faşizmin Ayak Sesleri (Footsteps of Fascism)
 Batının Deli Gömleği (The Straitjacket of the West)
 Sağım Solum Sobe (My Right my Left, Sobe!)
 Ulusal Kültür Savaşı (National Culture War)
 Sosyalizm Asıl Şimdi (Socialism Now)
 Aydınlar Savaşı (War of Intellectuals)
 Kadınlar Savaşı (War of Women)
 Bir Sap Kırmızı Karanfil (A Red Carnation Stalk)
 Ufkun Arkasını Görebilmek (To See Beyond the Horizon)

Short stories
 Yengecin Kıskacı (Crab's Pincer)

Translations
 "Kanton'da İsyan" (The Conquerors by André Malraux)
 "Umut" (Man's Hope by André Malraux)
 "Basel'in Çanları" (The Bells of Basel by Louis Aragon)

References
 "Ecevit and Can Yucel Used to Make Fun of Me" by Rahime Sezgin (1 November 2005), Zaman Daily Newspaper

External links
Şiirleri - Poems

1925 births
2005 deaths
Burials at Aşiyan Asri Cemetery
Istanbul University Faculty of Law alumni
Balıkesir Lisesi alumni
People from Menemen
State Artists of Turkey
Turkish journalists
Turkish novelists
Turkish poets
Turkish prisoners and detainees
Turkish socialists
Turkish nationalists
20th-century poets
20th-century novelists
20th-century journalists